Burgmann Anglican School is an independent school in Canberra, Australia, servicing students from pre-school to Grade 12. It has been noted as one of the best performing schools in the Australian Capital Territory. It is the sister school of The Affiliated High School of Sichuan University, Chengdu Number 12 Middle School.

References

External links
School Website

Private primary schools in the Australian Capital Territory
Private secondary schools in the Australian Capital Territory